The 1971 Taça de Portugal Final was the final match of the 1970–71 Taça de Portugal, the 31st season of the Taça de Portugal, the premier Portuguese football cup competition organized by the Portuguese Football Federation (FPF). The match was played on 27 June 1971 at the Estádio Nacional in Oeiras, and opposed two Primeira Liga sides: Benfica and Sporting CP. Sporting CP defeated Benfica 4–1 to claim a seventh Taça de Portugal.

Match

Details

References

1971
Taca
S.L. Benfica matches
Sporting CP matches